These were the squads that were named for the 2022 Women's Cricket World Cup. Each team selected a squad of fifteen players for the World Cup, excluding reserves. On 6 January 2022, India became the first to announce their squad for the tournament.

Key

Australia
In January 2022, Australia's fast bowler Tayla Vlaeminck suffered a stress fracture in her right foot, ruling her out their series against Australia and the World Cup. On 26 January 2022, Australia named their squad.

 Meg Lanning (c)
 Rachael Haynes (vc)
 Darcie Brown
 Nicola Carey
 Ashleigh Gardner
 Heather Graham
 Grace Harris
 Alyssa Healy
 Jess Jonassen
 Alana King
 Tahlia McGrath
 Beth Mooney
 Ellyse Perry
 Megan Schutt
 Annabel Sutherland
 Amanda-Jade Wellington

Hannah Darlington and Georgia Redmayne were both named as reserve players. Darlington later withdrew from the squad and was replaced by Heather Graham. Graham was eventually added to Australia's squad as a temporary replacement for Ashleigh Gardner, after Gardner gave a positive test for COVID-19.

Bangladesh
On 28 January 2022, Bangladesh named their squad.

 Nigar Sultana (c)
 Rumana Ahmed
 Nahida Akter
 Sharmin Akhter
 Jahanara Alam
 Suraiya Azmin
 Fargana Hoque
 Fahima Khatun
 Murshida Khatun
 Salma Khatun
 Lata Mondal
 Ritu Moni
 Sobhana Mostary
 Shamima Sultana
 Fariha Trisna

Nuzhat Tasnia and Sanjida Akter Meghla were both named as reserve players.

England
On 10 February 2022, England named their squad.

 Heather Knight (c)
 Tammy Beaumont
 Katherine Brunt
 Kate Cross
 Freya Davies
 Charlie Dean
 Sophia Dunkley
 Sophie Ecclestone
 Tash Farrant
 Amy Jones (wk)
 Emma Lamb
 Nat Sciver
 Anya Shrubsole
 Lauren Winfield-Hill
 Danni Wyatt

Lauren Bell and Mady Villiers were both named as reserves.

India
On 6 January 2022, India named their squad.

 Mithali Raj (c)
 Harmanpreet Kaur (vc)
 Taniya Bhatia (wk)
 Yastika Bhatia
 Rajeshwari Gayakwad
 Richa Ghosh (wk)
 Jhulan Goswami
 Smriti Mandhana
 Sneh Rana
 Deepti Sharma
 Meghna Singh
 Renuka Singh
 Pooja Vastrakar
 Shafali Verma
 Poonam Yadav

Simran Bahadur, Ekta Bisht, Sabbhineni Meghana were named as stand-by players.

New Zealand
On 3 February 2022, New Zealand named their squad. Lauren Down was ruled out of New Zealand's squad after suffering an injury during the fifth WODI match against India, with Georgia Plimmer named as her replacement. Molly Penfold was also added to the squad as a reserve player.

 Sophie Devine (c)
 Amy Satterthwaite (vc)
 Suzie Bates
 Lauren Down (w/d)
 Maddy Green
 Brooke Halliday
 Hayley Jensen
 Fran Jonas
 Jess Kerr
 Amelia Kerr
 Frances Mackay
 Rosemary Mair
 Katey Martin
 Georgia Plimmer
 Hannah Rowe
 Lea Tahuhu

Pakistan
On 24 January 2022, Pakistan named their squad.

 Bismah Maroof (c)
 Nida Dar (vc)
 Muneeba Ali (wk)
 Sidra Ameen
 Anam Amin
 Aiman Anwer
 Diana Baig
 Ghulam Fatima
 Javeria Khan
 Nahida Khan
 Sidra Nawaz (wk)
 Aliya Riaz
 Fatima Sana
 Nashra Sandhu
 Omaima Sohail

Iram Javed, Najiha Alvi and Tuba Hassan were all named as reserves.

South Africa
In January 2022, South Africa's captain Dane van Niekerk suffered a fractured ankle, ruling her out of their series against the West Indies and the World Cup. On 4 February 2022, South Africa named their squad.

 Suné Luus (c)
 Chloe Tryon (vc)
 Tazmin Brits
 Trisha Chetty
 Lara Goodall
 Shabnim Ismail
 Sinalo Jafta
 Marizanne Kapp
 Ayabonga Khaka
 Masabata Klaas
 Lizelle Lee
 Nonkululeko Mlaba
 Mignon du Preez
 Tumi Sekhukhune
 Laura Wolvaardt

Anneke Bosch, Nadine de Klerk and Raisibe Ntozakhe were all named as reserves.

West Indies
On 20 February 2022, the West Indies named their squad.

 Stafanie Taylor (c)
 Anisa Mohammed (vc)
 Aaliyah Alleyne
 Shemaine Campbelle
 Shamilia Connell
 Deandra Dottin
 Afy Fletcher
 Cherry-Ann Fraser
 Chinelle Henry
 Kycia Knight
 Hayley Matthews
 Chedean Nation
 Karishma Ramharack
 Shakera Selman
 Rashada Williams

Kaysia Schultz, Mandy Mangru and Jannillea Glasgow were all named as reserves.

References

Women's Cricket World Cup squads
squads